The Department of Physics in Lund is a department that belongs to both the Faculty of Natural Sciences and the Faculty of Engineering at Lund University. The main goals are to expand the understanding of physics, its applications and to share scientific progress to new generations. Research is conducted in most of the physics subdivisions. The department also offers courses and a Masters's degree programs in pure physics and provides physics education for the Master of Science in Engineering programs.

History 
In 1666 Lund University was founded without a faculty of science, so the physics research was conducted under the faculty of philosophy. In addition, during its first 150 years the University had no professorship in pure physics, so the teachings was instead given by professors in mathematics. There were however a course in experimental physics from the early 18th century, but that course was given by a professor in theoretical medicine; Kilian Stobæus was appointed as the first professor in 1728. It wasn't until the early 19th century that the physics professorship split from the mathematics, but then the professorship was shared with the astronomy. The University received its first full professor in physics in 1839.

Although a pure department of science was not established until the late 19th century, the seeds for the department was established in 1735 when the physics teaching received its own space in the building Kungshuset. The teaching was held inside Kungshuset until the late 19th century, when the department moved to its own building which had instrumental halls, auditoriums, workshops and a library. The department moved again in 1950 to a large building complex named Fysicum due to increased space requirements, and it has been there since then.

Research 
At the Department of Physics advanced research takes place divided in different divisions. The research areas are: Atomic Physics, Combustion Physics, Mathematical Physics, Nuclear Physics, Particle Physics, Solid State Physics and Synchrotron Radiation Research.

The department also hosts the Lund Nano Lab (LNL), part of NanoLund (formerly known as the Nanometer Structure Consortium), an interdisciplinary research environment for nanoscience and its applications in electronics, the life sciences etc. Further research centers are Lund Laser Centre (LLC), Consortium for Aerosol Science and Technology (CAST) and Lund University Combustion Centre (LUCC).

Scientists with activity at the department 
Manne Siegbahn was awarded the Nobel Prize in Physics for his discoveries and research in X-ray spectroscopy. Johannes Rydberg became famous for formulating the Rydberg formula and he got a physical constant named after him. Three scientists from the departement have participated in the popular television program Fråga Lund: Nina Reistad, Bodil Jönsson and Sten von Friesen. Hellmuth Hertz was a pioneer in sonography and was one of the first to develop the inkjet printer, and Anne L'Huillier was a pioneer in the research on ultra short laser pulses. All of the above physicists are or have been members of the Royal Swedish Academy of Sciences. Other members of the Royal Swedish Academy of Sciences from the departement are Bengt Edlén, Hermann Grimmeiss, Cecilia Jarlskog, Heiner Linke, Claes Fahlander, Lars Samuelson, Torsten Gustafson, Cecilia Jarlskog, Ingolf Lindau, Hans Ryde, Sune Svanberg, Claes-Göran Wahlström and Torsten Åkesson.

Notes

External links 
 Department of Physics
 NanoLund
 Lund Laser Centre
 Consortium for Aerosol Science and Technology

Lund University
University departments in Sweden
1735 establishments in Sweden
Lund University